The Prince and the Dancer (German:Der Prinz und die Tänzerin) is a 1926 German silent film directed by Richard Eichberg and starring Willy Fritsch, Lucy Doraine and Hans Albers. The film was shot at the Johannisthal Studios with sets designed by the art director Kurt Richter. It premiered at the Gloria-Palast in Berlin.

Cast
In alphabetical order
 Hans Albers 
 Lucy Doraine
 Adolphe Engers 
 Willy Fritsch 
 Fritz Kampers 
 Sybille Lerchenfeld
 Albert Paul 
 Albert Paulig 
 Hermann Picha 
 Robert Scholz 
 Franz Schönfeld 
 Julia Serda 
 Valeska Stock 
 Charlotte Susa 
 Leopold von Ledebur

References

Bibliography
 Bock, Hans-Michael & Bergfelder, Tim. The Concise CineGraph. Encyclopedia of German Cinema. Berghahn Books, 2009.

External links

1926 films
Films of the Weimar Republic
Films directed by Richard Eichberg
German silent feature films
German black-and-white films
Films shot at Johannisthal Studios